Vagococcus coleopterorum is a Gram-positive and facultative anaerobic bacterium from the genus of Vagococcus which has been isolated from the intestine of the diving beetle Cybister lewisianus.

References 

Lactobacillales
Bacteria described in 2020